The High Court of Azad Jammu and Kashmir (commonly known as Azad Kashmir High Court) is an appellate court in Muzaffarabad, Azad Jammu and Kashmir. It hears appeals from the District Courts of Azad Kashmir. The court has three circuit benches based in Kotli, Mirpur, and Rawalakot.

In 2016, Sardar Muhammad Yaqoob Khan, president of Azad Kashmir appointed Raja Sadaqat Hussain as a permanent judge of the High Court of Azad Jammu and Kashmir in consultation with the High Court chief justice and on the advice of the Kashmir Council.

See also 
 Supreme Court of Azad Jammu and Kashmir

References

External links 
 

High Courts of Pakistan
Judiciary of Azad Kashmir